Phoenician–Punic literature refers to the literature written in Phoenician, the language of the ancient civilization of Phoenicia, or in the Punic language that developed from Phoenician and was used in Ancient Carthage. It is surrounded by an aura of mystery due to the few preserved remains. All that is left is a series of inscriptions, few of which are of a purely literary nature (e.g. historical tales, poems, etc.), coins, fragments of Sanchuniathon's History and Mago's Treaty, the Greek translation of the voyage of Hanno the Navigator and the Poenulus by Plautus.

However, it is a proven fact that both Phoenicia and Carthage had extensive libraries and that Phoenicians had a rich literary production inherited from their Canaanite past, of which works by Philo of Byblos and Menander of Ephesus are only a small part.

History and sources 

The Jewish historian Flavius Josephus alludes to the Phoenician or Tyrian chronicles that he allegedly consulted to write his historical works. Herodotus also mentioned the existence of books from Byblos and a History of Tyre preserved in the temple of Hercules-Melqart in Tyre. In addition, it is possible to find some remnants of the influence exerted by certain writings of Ugarit in some biblical books, such as the Genesis or the Book of Ruth, that had traces of poetic compositions of religious or political themes — with a markedly propagandistic or philosophical undertone.

Rufius Festus Avienius also alludes to old Punic records from where he would have drawn his reports on the voyage of Himilco. Greco-Roman sources mention a number of Punic books saved from the looting and burning of Carthage by the legions of Scipio Africanus in the spring of 146 BC. In his work Natural History, Pliny indicates that after the fall of Carthage, many of these books were handed over to the Numidian rulers and the Roman Senate ordered their translation into Latin — specifically Mago's agricultural work, establishing a commission under the leadership of Decimus Junius Pison.

According to the Byzantine Encyclopedia called Suda, there was a historian of antiquity known as Charon of Carthage that wrote a collection of books: Lives of Illustrious Men, Lives of Illustrious Women, and Tyrants.
Augustine of Hippo (who lived between the 3rd and 4th centuries AD) considered Punic as one of the main "sapiential" languages, along with Hebrew, Canaanite, Latin and Greek. On Punic literature, he wrote:Quae lingua si improbatur abs te, nega Punicis Libris, ut a viris doctissimus proditur, multa sapienter esse mandata memoriae (English: If you reject this language, you are denying what many scholars have acknowledged: many things have been wisely preserved from oblivion thanks to books written in Punic.)To Augustine, this literature was not only ancient but also contemporary. He mentioned abecedaria and psalms composed in Punic and that both Donatists and Neo-Punic Catholics wrote "little books in Punic" with "testimonies of the sacred scriptures". An important part of the Bible is thought to have been translated into Neo-Punic.

Subjects

Agricultural treaties 
This is one of the areas where the most information is available, since it is known that after the end of the Third Punic War, the Roman Senate decided to translate an encyclopedic treaty on agronomy written by Mago - considered by Columella as the father of Agronomy - into Latin. This treaty comprised 28 books - of which 66 fragments have been preserved. It includes topics such as viticulture, topography, veterinary medicine, beekeeping, and fruit arboriculture, as well as recommendations defending the idea that the properties should not be too large and that the owner should not be absent.

Mago may not have been the only Carthaginian treatisist concerned with these topics, since Columella clearly indicates that there were several other writers focusing on the subject. However, He does not specify who they might have been or the depth of their work - with the exception of one Amilcar.

Philosophical writings 
Philosophical works are likely to have been written even if there is little evidence, since it is known that in Carthage as well as in Gadir there were Platonic and Pythagorean schools, currents that seem to have been widely accepted in the colonial Phoenician sphere. We only know of works by Moderatus, of the Gaditan school, who wrote in Greek. A treaty on philosophy is attributed to Sanchuniathon - of which there is no record other than a simple mention.

Religious writings 
The fragments of Sanchuniathon's work that have been preserved form the most extensive religious text on Phoenician mythology known to date. It is a kind of Theogony that includes passages on cosmogony, heroic tales, the life of the gods, and the use of rituals with snakes. There is also an allusion made by Plutarch in regards to a series of sacred scrolls rescued from Carthage and hidden underground, although the veracity of this information has not been confirmed. Conversely, Phoenician religious literature is known to have had a profound influence on the biblical account of Job.

History treaties 
In The Histories by Polybius, he clearly refers to Carthaginian historians, and Sallust claimed to have consulted the Punic books of the Numidian king Hiempsal. Sanchuniathon's historical work, considered the most extensive work produced in Phoenician, was translated into Greek in 2 BC, although only a long fragment has been preserved - one that primarily covers religious themes. However, the authenticity of the texts attributed to Sanchuniathon has been questioned several times, without reaching a clear consensus.

There are numerous allusions in Greek literature - until after 3 BC - to a Cosmogony written by Mochus of Sidon in 14 BC. The likely existence of biographies of Hannibal has also been noted. According to Polybius and Titus Livy, Hannibal had such deeds recorded in Phoenician and Greek in 205 BC, in the temple of Hera in Lacinia, and it is probable that he was simply continuing an ancient tradition by which Carthaginian generals used to write down their heroic deeds and give them to a temple to be preserved. Another example of this type of literature is an inscription on the takeover of Agrigentum in 406 BC, of which a small fragment of a text that must have been larger is preserved:

Poetry 

Found fragments of Phoenician poems indicate that rhymed rhetorical prose and poetic narration in iambic rhythms were widely used, among other genres.

Language and grammar 
Little is known about Phoenician's grammatical knowledge. A Latin manuscript, the Berne codex 123, suggests Phoenician had 12 parts of speech: the traditional eight (noun, pronoun, verb, adjective, adverb, preposition, conjunction and interjection) plus the article, the impersonal mood, the infinitive and the gerund. In addition, Eusebius of Caesarea attributes the authorship of a treaty titled On the Phoenician Alphabet to Sanchuniathon.

Navigation and geography treaties 
Although the Phoenicians were famous as navigators and explorers, the only two accounts to have survived up to this day are the stories of Hanno the Navigator and Himilco. Hannon's original account seems to be no older than 2 BC, thus raising the question of whether it was made when Carthage was destroyed. Interestingly, Greek and Latin historiography seemed to be completely unaware of this voyage before the fall of the Punic capital.

Himilcon's journey can be traced only to some comments made by Avienius, which he claims come from ancient Punic records he might have accessed. Another hypothesis is that King Juba II based his geographical knowledge of the Nile's origins on Punic books that he kept at his court - as recorded by Amianus Marcellinus - indicating that the river's headwaters were on a mountain in Mauritania.

A similar thing applies to the voyages supposedly carried out by this monarch in the Canary archipelago, an expedition recorded by Pliny. Although it is clear from the way Pliny describes the islands that a real voyager reached this region, discussions are currently underway as to whether this expedition was carried out by Juba II or if he merely collected a series of data he found in the Carthaginian books he inherited from his ancestors. In turn, Marinus of Tyre (born in 1 AD) was considered as the first geographer of his time worthy of the title of "scientist". Although his original work has disappeared, Claudius Ptolemy used it extensively while writing his Geographia.

International and legislative treaties 
No direct information is available, but there is evidence that the international treaties Rome signed with Carthage were kept in the Capitol on bronze tablets, and it is to be presumed that the Punics preserved them as well. The treaty signed in 215 BC by Hannibal and Philip V of Macedon is known to have been drafted in Greek and Punic, and alluded to various Carthaginian divinities reminiscent of the treaty signed centuries before by Esarhaddon and the King of Tyre, a fact widely interpreted as a sign of state conservatism that could be explained only through the preservation of these documents over the centuries.

Translated literature 

Many classical authors - and even a few contemporary ones - have argued that, in antiquity, only the Romans were sufficiently educated to understand and translate Greek plays. Paradoxically, one of the few recorded translations of Greek plays into Punic is precisely in the play Poenulus by the Roman playwright Plautus.

With the rise of Carthage in the 5th century BC, Phoenician became a prestigious language in the Mediterranean, competing with Latin and Greek, which led to these translation efforts. Quoted below are two fragments from Poenulus ("The Little Punic"), a translation of the Greek play ὁ Καρχηδόνιος (ho Karkhēdónios, "the Carthaginian"), possibly by the poet Alexis of Thurii (375-275 BC) in which Plautus included fragments from the Punic translation of the same play as well as from several other translations he knew of, both to amuse the audience through the foreign sounds and as a basis for puns and mistranslations:

See also 

 Phoenician alphabet
 Punic people

References 

Literature
Phoenician language
Literature by language
Phoenicia
Carthage
Punic language